Todros (Hebrew: טודרוס) is a Medieval Sephardic surname and given name that derives from the Greek “Theodoros”, which means "gift/present of God". In some cases, Todros is a literal translation of the Hebrew biblical male name Natan-El.

People with the given name Todros 

 Todros Geller (1889) - Jewish-American artist.
 Todros Todrosi (1313) - Sephardic translator. 
 Todros ben Judah Halevi Abulafia (1247) - Sephardic poet. 
 Todros ben Joseph Abulafia (1225) - Chief Rabbi of Castile.

People with the patronymic Todros 

 Isaac ben Todros (14th century) - Spanish Rabbi.
 Kalonymus ben Todros (1194) - Sephardic Nasi. 
 Meir ben Todros HaLevi Abulafia (1170) - Spanish Rabbi.

People with the surname Todros 
David Todros - Fictional character.

References 

Sephardic surnames